Jayanta Kumar Roy (born 3 February 1968) is an Indian politician. He has been elected to the Lok Sabha, lower house of the Parliament of India from Jalpaiguri, West Bengal in the 2019 Indian general election as a member of the Bharatiya Janata Party.

Personal life
Roy was born to Hemendra Narayan Roy and Jaya Roy on 3 February 1968 in Lataguri in Jalpaiguri district of West Bengal. A qualified physician, Roy did MBBS and MD from North Bengal Medical College. He married Debjani Roy on 22 January 1992, with whom he has a son and a daughter.

References

External links
Official biographical sketch in Parliament of India website

1968 births
India MPs 2019–present
Lok Sabha members from West Bengal
Living people
Bharatiya Janata Party politicians from West Bengal
People from Jalpaiguri